Ælfgifu (also Ælfgyfu; Elfgifa, Elfgiva, Elgiva) is an Anglo-Saxon feminine personal name, from ælf "elf" and gifu "gift".  
When Emma of Normandy, the later mother of Edward the Confessor,  became queen of England in 1002, she was given the native Anglo-Saxon name of Ælfgifu  to be used in formal and official contexts.

Latinized forms of the name include forms such as Aelueua, Alueua, Alueue, Elgiva, Elueua, Aluiua, Aueue (etc.).

People called Ælfgifu:
 Ælfgifu of Exeter, Anglo-Saxon saint
 Ælfgifu of Northampton, first wife of King Cnut the Great. Her name became Álfífa in Old Norse.
 Ælfgifu of Shaftesbury, wife of King Edmund I of England
 Ælfgifu of York, first wife of Æthelred the Unready
 Ælfgifu, wife of Eadwig, king of England
 as Elgiva, the female protagonist of Edwy and Elgiva, a  1790 verse tragedy by  Frances Burney
 Emma of Normandy adopted the name  Ælfgifu upon her marriage to Æthelred the Unready 
 Ælfgifu, wife of Ælfgar, Earl of Mercia
 Ælfgifu, daughter of Godwin, Earl of Wessex, and sister of King Harold II of England
 Ælfgifu, daughter of Æthelred the Unready and wife of Uhtred, Earl of Northumbria
 Ælfgyva, a woman of unknown identity in the Bayeux Tapestry

Elgiva may also refer to:
 Elgiva (fly), a genus of insects

References

Old English given names